Mashkautsan (sometimes Mashkautzan, Mashcautsan, etc.) is a surname of Bessarabian Jews. It is a toponymic surname literally meaning "one from Mașcăuți". Notable people with the surname include:

Shabsa Mashkautsan (1924–2022), Soviet soldier, Hero of the Soviet Union

References

Jewish surnames
Toponymic surnames